Is it Selfish If We Talk About Me Again is the second studio album by American singer-songwriter Kacy Hill. It was released on July 10, 2020 independently, following her departure from Kanye West's label GOOD Music. Much of the album's art was shot by Chuck Grant.

The album marks Hill's debut as a producer, and was made in collaboration primarily with Francis and the Lights, BJ Burton, and Jim-E Stack, Hill's partner. Much of the song's lyrical content was inspired by their relationship. Lyrically, the album explores mental health, growth, and love.

Track listing
Credits adapted from the album's vinyl liner notes.

Notes

 ^[a] signifies an additional producer

References

2020 albums
Albums produced by BJ Burton
Self-released albums